Karl Neumeyer (September 19, 1869-July 17, 1941) was a German Jewish jurist who, persecuted by Nazis, committed suicide.

Early life 
Karl Neumeyer was the younger brother of the judge and chairman of the Association of Bavarian and Jewish Communities Alfred Neumeyer. He attended the Maximiliansgymnasium and then studied law in Munich, Berlin and Geneva. In 1900 he married Anna Hirschhorn, with whom he had two children: Alfred (1901-1973) and Fritz (1905).

In 1901 he obtained his habilitation at the University of Munich, becoming associate professor in 1908. He dealt with private international law and founded the legal field of international administrative law. In 1926 he received the title of full professor. In 1931 he became faculty dean.

After Hitler came to power in 1933, Neumeyer was persecuted due to his Jewish origins. In 1934 he was banned from teaching and publishing. In 1941, faced with imminent deportation and murder, he and his wife committed suicide. He is buried in the New Jewish Cemetery in Munich.

Commemorations 

In Munich, several sites commemorate Karl Neumeyer. In July 2019, a memorial sign was installed at Königinstraße 35a in Maxvorstadt. In 1962, Neumeyerstraße in Allach-Untermenzing was named after him. In 2008, the building of the Faculty of Law of the University of Munich at Veterinärstraße 5 was named Karl-Neumeyer-Haus. It already hosted a Neumeyer hall and a memorial plaque.

Bibliography

References 

1941 deaths
1869 births
People who died in the Holocaust
Academic staff of the Ludwig Maximilian University of Munich
20th-century German jurists